The Holy Trinity Cathedral, officially known as Cathedral Church of the Most Holy Trinity is an Anglican church in Accra, Ghana. Completed in 1894, it is part of the Anglican Diocese of Accra in the Church of the Province of West Africa.

History
The funding for the Cathedral came from the colonial British government and was initially patronized by colonial expatriates.  It was designed by Aston Webb.  In 1909, the building was deemed a cathedral upon the creation of the Diocese of Accra.

References

Anglican cathedrals in Ghana
Churches in Accra
Churches completed in 1894
19th-century Anglican church buildings